The 2015–16 Mississippi Valley State Delta Devils basketball team represented Mississippi Valley State University during the 2015–16 NCAA Division I men's basketball season. The Delta Devils, led by second year head coach Andre Payne, were members of the Southwestern Athletic Conference. Due to continued renovations to their normal home stadium, the Harrison HPER Complex, they played their home games at the Leflore County Civic Center in Greenwood, Mississippi. They finished the season 8–27, 6–12 in SWAC play to finish in a three way tie for seventh place. They defeated Grambling State and Alcorn State to advance to the semifinals of the SWAC tournament where they lost to Jackson State.

Roster

Schedule

|-
!colspan=9 style="background:#228B22; color:#FFFFFF;"| Non-conference Regular season

|-
!colspan=9 style="background:#228B22; color:#FFFFFF;"|SWAC regular season

|-
!colspan=9 style="background:#228B22; color:#FFFFFF;"| SWAC tournament

References

Mississippi Valley State Delta Devils basketball seasons
Mississippi Valley State
Mississippi Valley
Mississippi Valley